Futurekids, Inc. is a privately held internationally franchised K–12 educational software company headquartered in El Segundo, California, which focuses on technological literacy and computer literacy.

History 
Founded in 1983, Futurekids was among the first computer and technology training programs in the United States, with a focus on tutored computer learning centers and pre-school technology learning. In 1996, the company was purchased by Robert M. Davidson and Janice G. Davidson, Ph.D., education entrepreneurs and founders of Davidson & Associates, an early educational software company and maker of the famous Math Blaster and Reading Blaster series.

The company currently offers professional development programs and K–12 technology curriculum in schools in 65 countries. It focuses on the integration of technology and the use of computers in the educational process.  Their professional development course is used in the Los Angeles Unified School District, Pennsylvania, and other districts around the world and offered through Dell training and technology certification, and is certified in a number of universities for continuing education units (CEUs) needed for teaching re-certification in the U.S.

In the early 2000's, the company started the Company Owned Division that was run by Ernie Delgado, a former Regional Sales Manager in the Southwest Division.  The Company Owned Division quickly grew to one of the largest divisions of Futurekids and grew to over $50M in annual revenue which made Futurekids an attractive purchase.  Ernie went on to win several sales milestones awards before his departure in 2001.

Ernie Delgado went on to become the CEO and Founder of Beyond Technology Education, a thriving edtech curriculum publisher and services provider.

In 2008, the Software and Information Industry Association (SIIA) selected Futurekids’ Real Journeys in Technology curriculum as a 2008 Codie awards finalist   among educational software in the best instructional solution in other curriculum areas category.

Futurekids Inc. ceased operations on June 30, 2009.  Franchises worldwide continue to offer the Futurekids curriculum, including but not limited to Futurekids Hong Kong.

Projects
Futurekids’ products and services are aligned with technology standards, including the International Society for Technology in Education (ISTE); the Software and Information Industry Association (SIIA); Project Tomorrow, and the Consortium for School Networking (CSN).

Futurekids has been awarded contracts for their educational products by the state of Michigan and Pennsylvania.

In 2004, Platinum Television Group selected Futurekids for a segment on Today's Family, a series that celebrates successful parenting solutions,

In 2005, Futurekids worked with Intel Corporation and other technology and national youth organizations in creating the Partnership for 21st Century Skills, an advocacy organization for positioning computer skills at the center of U.S. K–12. In November 2007, the Partnership for 21st Century Skills launched Route 21, an online, one-stop shop for 21st-century skills-related information, resources and tools.

In 2006, Adobe, Intel, Lenovo Group and Futurekids created a web portal, 21st Century Connections.

In 2007, Futurekids expanded its innovative professional development program to more schools the “Classrooms for the Future” technology initiative in the state of Pennsylvania.  The Classrooms for the Future initiative, believed to be the largest program of technology integration ever undertaken by a state, allocates $200 million in funding over a three-year period for laptop computers, software, printers, interactive electronic whiteboards, professional development, technology infrastructure, support and high-speed Internet access. Futurekids was tapped to provide some professional development services for the initiative.

Evaluation studies 
The “Innovation and Best Practice Project” on information and communication technology conducted in Adelaide, South Australia,  found that "the Futurekids’ curriculum engenders authentic learning and student engagement."

A research project conducted by Boise State University, Boise, ID, to determine the effects of a new  program provided by Futurekids for 5th-grade students and teachers concluded the "Technology enriched learning environment had an overall positive effect on reducing a student’s anxiety towards computers and raising their level of enjoyment."

The Center for Positive Practices conducted a controlled study of the effectiveness of Futurekids, Inc.’s professional development tools and concluded   "Futurekids professional development participants performed significantly better than a non-treatment control group on posttest computer literacy... "

Higher math and reading scores in the Kentwood Public Schools District (Michigan) were attributed primarily to the initiation of a technology education program with Futurekids in 1993.

Newsome Park Elementary School in Newport News, Virginia, implemented a Futurekids program to teach children about technology and apply it to their personal endeavors.   In recognition of the program, the school received the 2003 “Virginia Technology Program of the Year Award,”   Newsome Park was also recognized as one of 26 program excellence award winners in the U.S. by the International Technology Education Association.

References

Educational technology companies of the United States